Asaphodes chionogramma is a moth in the family Geometridae. It is endemic to New Zealand and found in both the North and South Islands. This species inhabits the lower slopes of mountains in valleys with native forest at altitudes of between 2000 and 3000 ft. The adults of this species are on the wing in December and January.

Taxonomy

This species was first described by Edward Meyrick in 1883 as Larentia chionogramma. Meyrick gave a fuller description of the species later in 1884.  George Hudson  discussed and illustrated the species in his 1898 volume New Zealand Moths and Butterflies and referred to it as Xanthorhoe chionogramma. He also discussed and illustrated this species using that same name in his 1928 publication. In 1971 J. S. Dugdale placed this species in the genus Asaphodes. This placement was reaffirmed by Dugdale in 1988. The male lectotype, collected at Mount Hutt, is held at the Natural History Museum, London.

Description 

Hudson described the species as follows:

Distribution 
Asaphodes chionogramma is endemic to New Zealand. This species can be found in the North and South Islands. Specimens of this species have been collected in the mid Canterbury. Meyrick collected this species at Mount Hutt and Hudson stated the species had been collected in the North Island at Mount Taranaki and also occurred at  Mount Arthur and Mount Hutt.

Behaviour 
The adults of this species is on the wing in December and January.

Habitat 
The habitat of this species is on the lower slopes of mountains in wooded valleys at altitudes of between 2000 and 3000 ft.

References

Moths described in 1883
Moths of New Zealand
Larentiinae
Endemic fauna of New Zealand
Taxa named by Edward Meyrick
Endemic moths of New Zealand